Annagora Aquapark is a water park in Balatonfüred spa town, near the Lake Balaton in Hungary.

Included are 3 water slides for children, 12 big slides and students with ISIC card receive a discount.

See also 
List of adventure parks in Hungary

References

External links 
Homepage
Location on Google Maps.

Water parks in Hungary
Lake Balaton